Laila Anna-Maria Milana Mišić-Puukari (née Salminen, from 1971 Mišić; born 23 October 1970, Espoo, Finland) is a Finnish singer of Croatian and Finnish descent.

Mišić is the daughter of Finnish Eurovision legend Laila Kinnunen and Yugoslav Croat musician Milan “Mišo” Mišić.

Discography
 Milana (1991)
 Serenata (1993)
 Sydän saa merkin (2001)
 Laulumme (2008)
 Valoa ikkunassa – 12 Laila Kinnusen ikimuistoista laulua (2009)
 Jos itken, jos nauran (2010)

References

External links

 Official site
 Milana at Äänitearkisto

1970 births
Living people
People from Espoo
Finnish people of Croatian descent
20th-century Finnish women singers
21st-century Finnish women singers